Fundy may refer to:

Places in Canada
Bay of Fundy, an Atlantic Canadian bay home to the highest tides in the world
Fundy National Park, on the Bay of Fundy
Fundy Biosphere Reserve, a UNESCO biosphere reserve designated in 2007

Other uses
Fundy, a video game streamer; cast member of the Minecraft server Dream SMP

See also

Fundi (disambiguation)